Valerie Hepworth  is a British charitable trustee. She was a founding member of the Yorkshire Gardens Trust and formerly served as Chairman of the Association of Gardens Trusts. Hepworth was awarded the British Empire Medal for services to the Yorkshire Gardens Trust in the 2019 Birthday Honours.

References

Living people
Year of birth missing (living people)
Trustees of charities
Recipients of the British Empire Medal